Mariborska koča (1142 m) is a  mountain hut, which lies on small plain, on southern part of Pohorje under Reški vrh and Ledinek kogl. It was built in 1911 and was burnt by Germans during WW2.

Starting points 
 By road from Hoče-Areh
 By cable car from Maribor

Neighbouring hills 
 ½h : Mariborski razglednik (1147 m) 
 ¾h : Bolfenk (1044 m) 
 1h : Ruška koča pri Arehu (1246m)

See also
 Slovenian Mountain Hiking Trail

References
 Slovenska planinska pot, Planinski vodnik, PZS, 2012, Milenko Arnejšek - Prle, Andraž Poljanec

External links
 Routes, Description & Photos

Mountain huts in Slovenia